Christopher David Ernest Bessey (born 1971) is a male retired boxer who competed for England.

Boxing career
Bessey was the National Champion in 1993 after winning the prestigious ABA welterweight title, boxing for the Army. He moved up in weight and won an impressive five more National titles at light middleweight (1995, 1997, 1998, 1999 and 2000).

He represented England in the light middleweight (-71 Kg) division, at the 1998 Commonwealth Games in Kuala Lumpur, Malaysia.

Bessey is a warrant officer in the British Army and a coach of the British army boxing team  and was awarded an MBE in the 1997 New Year Honours, when serving with the Royal Logistic Corps.

References

1971 births
English male boxers
Boxers at the 1998 Commonwealth Games
Living people
Commonwealth Games medallists in boxing
Commonwealth Games gold medallists for England
Light-middleweight boxers
Medallists at the 1998 Commonwealth Games